
Wolfslaar Restaurant is a restaurant in Breda, Netherlands. It is a fine dining restaurant that was awarded one Michelin star in 2005 and retained that rating until present.

In 2013, GaultMillau awarded the restaurant 15 out of 20 points.

Head chef  of Wolfslaar Restaurant is Maarten Camps.

The restaurant is located in the coach house of the Wolfslaar Estate. In 2011, the restaurant temporarily moved to the manor of the estate while the coach house was renovated. Most parts of the estate are Rijksmonuments, including the coach house itself.

See also
List of Michelin starred restaurants in the Netherlands

References 

Restaurants in the Netherlands
Michelin Guide starred restaurants in the Netherlands
Restaurants in North Brabant
Buildings and structures in Breda